Paula Cristina Gonçalves and Petra Krejsová were the defending champions, having won the previous edition in 2015, but chose not to participate.

Quinn Gleason and Ingrid Neel won the title, defeating Akgul Amanmuradova and Lizette Cabrera in the final, 5–7, 7–5, [10–8].

Seeds

Draw

Draw

References
Main Draw

Innisbrook Open - Doubles